Cemetery Boys is a young adult urban fantasy novel by Aiden Thomas, published September 1, 2020 by Swoon Reads. The book's placement on the New York Times Bestseller List made history as the first book on the list by an openly transgender author featuring a transgender character.

Plot 
Yadriel is queer, trans, Latino, and a brujo (witch). Brujos are known to possess the ability to summon spirits and release them from the physical realm, whereas Brujas possess healing powers. Unfortunately, his family does not recognize him as a man, and expect him to develop healing instead of summoning abilities. Along with his cousin and best friend, Maritza, Yadriel attempts to summon the ghost of his missing cousin, who is believed to have perished. Yadriel hopes that by successfully summoning his cousin, he will prove himself a Brujo. Instead, he calls forth Julian Diaz, a boy from Yadriel's school who does not remember how he died and is not ready to move on.

Reception 
Before Cemetery Boys was released, it was named one of the most anticipated books of 2020 by Book Riot, Tor.com, Goodreads, Paste Magazine, and Bitch Media.

After release, book was named a best seller by the New York Times and IndieBound, and received starred reviews from Publishers Weekly and Booklist. It was also named best book of the year by Publishers Weekly, NPR, and Barnes and Noble.

References 

Children's books with transgender themes
American LGBT novels
2020 American novels
Novels with transgender themes
Witchcraft in written fiction
LGBT speculative fiction novels
Gay male teen fiction
Children's books with LGBT themes
LGBT-related young adult novels
Young adult fantasy novels